Jordan Paul Dyer (born 29 May 2000) is an English semi professional footballer who plays as a defender for  club Bath City.

Playing career
Dyer turned professional at Exeter City in April 2018. He was briefly loaned out to Southern League Division One South side Bideford, featuring as a late substitute in a 4–1 win at Barnstaple Town on 26 December 2018. Two months later he joined Southern League Premier Division South club Tiverton Town on loan, featuring 14 times by the end of the 2018–19 season. He rejoined Tiverton on loan for the 2019–20 season and scored his first goal for Martyn Rogers's "Tivvy" in a 2–1 victory at Poole Town on 13 August. He made his first-team debut for Exeter on 4 December 2019, in a 0–0 draw with Oxford United at St James Park in the EFL Trophy. He started in the EFL Trophy semi-final against Portsmouth F.C. at Fratton Park.

On 30 September 2021, Dyer along with Ben Seymour joined National League club Yeovil Town on a one-month loan deal.

Having spent two times at the club on loan previously, Dyer joined National League South side Bath City on a permanent basis in June 2022 following his release from Exeter.

Style of play
Dyer is able to play as a defender or midfielder and is noted for his toughness.

Career statistics

References

External links

Living people
Sportspeople from Exeter
English footballers
Association football defenders
Association football midfielders
Exeter City F.C. players
Bideford A.F.C. players
Tiverton Town F.C. players
Chippenham Town F.C. players
Yeovil Town F.C. players
Bath City F.C. players
English Football League players
National League (English football) players
Southern Football League players
2000 births